Blandine is a predominantly French feminine given name derived from the Roman name Blandina, which was the feminine form of Blandinus, which is derived from the Latin cognomen Blandus, meaning "charming".  

Notable individuals bearing the name Blandine include:
Saint Blandine (162–177 AD), Christian martyr
Blandine Bitzner-Ducret (born 1965), French track and field athlete
Blandine Boulekone, Vanuatuan women's rights advocate
Blandine Brocard (born 1981), French politician
Blandine Dancette (born 1988), French handball player
Blandine Ebinger (1899–1993), German actress and chansonniere
Blandine Lachèze (born 1982), French pentathlete
Blandine Maisonnier (born 1986), French heptathlete
Blandine Merten (1883–1918), German Ursuline nun
Blandine N'Goran (born 1987), Ivorian basketball player
Blandine Rouille (born 1980), French yacht racer 
Blandine Verlet (1942–2018), French harpsichordist 
Blandine Rasoanamary Voizy, Malagasy politician

References

French feminine given names